Zee Tamil is an Indian Tamil general entertainment private broadcast television network owned by Zee Entertainment Enterprises.

This is a list of original programs that have been broadcast on Zee Tamil.

Current programming

Upcoming Series

Drama series

Reality shows

Former programming

Drama series
 
 Anandham (2014)
 Annakodiyum Aindhu Pengalum (2015–2016)
 Anbe Sivam (2021–2022)
 Avalukendru Oru Manam (2008–2009)
 Azhagana Ratchasee (2014)
 Azhagiya Tamil Magal (2017–2019)
 Chithiram Pesuthadi (2021–2022)
 Darling Darling (2016–2017)
 Devathaiyai Kanden (2017–2020)
 Endrendrum Punnagai (2020–2022)
 Gayathri (2014)
 Gokulathil Seethai (2019–2022)
 Kandukondain Kandukondain (2019–2020)
 Lakshmi Vandhachu (2015–2017)
 Mamiyar Thevai (2013–2014)
 Merku Mambalathil Oru Kaadhal (2012–2013)
 Mella Thirandhathu Kadhavu (2015–2017)
 Mullum Malarum (2017–2019)
 My Name Is Mangamma (2012–2013)
 Nachiyarpuram (2019–2020)
 Nalla Neram (2013–2014)
 Neethane Enthan Ponvasantham (2020–2021)
 Nenjathai Killadhe (2014–2015)
 Niram Maaratha Pookal (2017–2020)
 Oru Kai Osai (2014–2015)
 Oru Oorla Oru Rajakumari (2018–2021)
 Oru Oorla Rendu Rajakumari (2021–2022)
 Pava Mannippu (2014)
 Piriyadha Varam Vendum (2019–2020)
 Priyasaki (2015–2016)
 Pudhu Pudhu Arthangal (2021–2022)
 Puguntha Veedu (2012–2014)
 Poove Poochudava (2017–2021)
 Raja Magal (2019–2021)
 Ramani Vs Ramani (2013)
 Rekka Katti Parakkudhu Manasu (2017–2019)
 Rettai Roja (2019–2023)
 Rudra (2008–2009)
 Sathya 1 (2019–2021)
 Sathya 2 (2021–2022)
 Sembaruthi (2017–2022)
 Siva Ragasiyam (2014–2015)
 Sri Vishnu Dasavatharam (2018)
 Sollathaan Ninaikkiren (2009–2011)
 Suryavamsam (2020–2021)
 Thalayanai Pookal (2016–2018)
 Thiru Mangalyam (2014–2015)
 Thirumathi Hitler (2020–2022)
 Thulasi (2011–2013)
 Uyirmei (2014–2015)
 Yaaradi Nee Mohini (2017–2021)
 Yathumagi Nindrai (2010)

Dubbed series

 Chinna Poove Mella Pesu
 Chinna Marumagal 
 CID
 Crime Patrol
 Devi Parasakthi
 Fear Files
 Iniya Iru Malargal
 Jodha Akbar 
 Kaadhalukku Salaam
 Kaatrukkenna Veli
 Mahabharatham
 Mahamayi 
 Mapillai
 Marumanam
 Moondru Mugam
 Naagarani
 Naanum Oru Penn
 Puratchiyalar Dr. Ambedkar
 Radha Kalyanam
 Ramayanam
 Sivanum Naanum
 Thamarai
 Thenali Raaman
 Veera Marthandan
 Inya Iru Malargal
 Veera Shivaji
 Vishnu Puranam

Reality and non-scripted shows

 Aaha Enna Porutham
 Aaha Maamiyar Oho Marumagal
 Aayirathil Oruvan (Season 1 and 2) 
 Anjarai Petti
 Athirshta Lakshmi
 Chutti Champions
 Comedy Khiladis
 Dance Jodi Dance
 Dance Jodi Dance 2
 Dance Jodi Dance Juniors
 Dance Tamizha Dance
 Dance Tamizha Dance Little Masters
 Dancing Khilladies
 En Autograph
 Genes (Season 1, 2, and 3)
 Home Minister
 Jil Jung Juk
 Junior Senior
 Junior Super Star (Season 1 and 2)
 Junior Super Star 3.0
 Konjam Coffee Niraya Cinema
 Lucka Kicka Season 1 & 2
 Mr & Mrs Khiladis (Season 1 and 2)
 Nanben Da
 Namma Veetu Mahalakshmi
 Nil Kavani Sel
 Petta Rap
 Rockstar
 Sa Re Ga Ma Pa Challenge Tamil 2009
 Sa Re Ga Ma Pa Seniors (Season 1 and 2)
 Sa Re Ga Ma Pa Lil Champs (Season 1 and 2)
 Simply Kushboo
 Super Mom (Season 1 and 2)
 Sundays with Anil and Karky
 Survivor (Season 1)
 Solvathellam Unmai (Season 1 and 2)
 Solla Thudikkuthu Manasu
 Top 10
 Weekend with Stars
 Why This Kolaveri
 Zee Dance League
 Zee Super Family
 Zee Super Talents

References

External links 
 

Zee Tamil
Zee Tamil